Robert Allen (June 19, 1778 – August 19, 1844) was an American merchant and politician from Carthage, Tennessee. He represented Tennessee in the United States House of Representatives from 1819 until 1827.

Biography
Allen was born in Augusta County, Virginia, and attended schools there, culminating in the College of William & Mary. He married Rebecca Greer on December 28, 1803, in Jonesboro, Tennessee.  After graduating from his law studies, he moved to Carthage, Tennessee and took up the Mercantile business as well as practicing as a lawyer in 1804.  He also served as Clerk of Smith County for many years. He owned slaves.

Career
During the War of 1812, Allen served as a colonel under General Andrew Jackson. After the war, he was elected to the United States House of Representatives, serving four terms.  While there, he chaired the U.S. House Committee on Revolutionary Claims (regarding claims from the U.S. Revolutionary War). His wife, Rebecca died on March 29, 1822; and he married Alethia Van Horn on March 3, 1825.  He declined to stand for re-election in the 1826 elections, and retired to Tennessee at the end of the term. He was a delegate to the State convention in 1834.

Death
Allen engaged in farming and mercantile pursuits until his death in Carthage, Smith County, Tennessee, on August 19, 1844 (age 66 years, 61 days). He is interred at Cedar Grove Cemetery, Wilson County, Tennessee. He died at "Greenwood," his plantation near Carthage.

See also
 Eliza Allen (Tennessee), first wife of Sam Houston, Robert's niece

References

External links
Biographic sketch at U.S. Congress website

1778 births
1844 deaths
People from Augusta County, Virginia
American people of Scotch-Irish descent
Democratic-Republican Party members of the United States House of Representatives from Tennessee
Jacksonian members of the United States House of Representatives from Tennessee
Tennessee lawyers
American slave owners
People from Carthage, Tennessee
College of William & Mary alumni
American military personnel of the War of 1812